Surkis is a surname. Notable people with the surname include:
 
Hryhoriy Surkis (born 1949), Ukrainian businessman
Ihor Surkis (born 1958), Ukrainian businessman
Mordechai Surkis (1908–1995), Israeli politician